Shopping is a shopping mall in downtown Luleå, Sweden. Designed by architect Ralph Erskine, it was the first purpose built indoor shopping centre in the world when it opened in October 1955. Erskine designed it with an intent to let "city life" move indoors during the cold seasons. Since its inauguration, it has seen multiple refurbishments and alterations, but is still used as a shopping mall.

See also

Midtown Plaza (Rochester)

References

1955 establishments in Sweden
Buildings and structures in Norrbotten County
Commercial buildings completed in 1955
Luleå
Shopping centres in Sweden
Shopping malls established in 1955